Melancholia is a 1532 oil on panel painting by Lucas Cranach the Elder, now in the National Gallery of Denmark in Copenhagen.

Subject and composition
Melancholia depicts three naked babies who, with the help of sticks, try to roll a large ball through the hoop. A winged woman, lost in thought, is slicing a cane, perhaps intending to make another hoop. She is the personification of melancholy, similar to the winged genius from the engraving of the same name by Albrecht Dürer, executed 18 years before the painting of Cranach.

According to the ideals of the Renaissance, the whole world was based on analogies. So, melancholy at that time was associated with Saturn, a dog, carpentry. Many details of the picture are a reference to these analogies: the jump of witches in a black cloud, and an army in which soldiers fall from their horses.

Bibliography
Nicolas Barker: A poet in Paradise: Lord Lindsay and Christian art, 2000, p. 98.
Charles Zika: The Wild Cavalcade in Lucas Cranach’s Melancholia Painting: Witchcraft and Sexual Disorder in 16th Century Germany, 1997, p. 65–70, p. 75, p.79, ill. fig. 13+14
 Günter Bandmann: Melancholie und Musik: Ikonographische Studien, 1960, pp. 73f, ill. fig. 28
Raymond Klibansky: Saturn and Melancholy: Studies in the History of Natural Philosophy, Religion and Art, 1964, p. 383
 Cranach: l’altro rinascimento, 2010, cat. 12, pp. 164 and 16, ill. pp. 166–167

Paintings by Lucas Cranach the Elder
Paintings in the collection of the National Gallery of Denmark
1532 paintings
Cranach
Dogs in art
Pigs in art
Sheep in art
Paintings of children
16th-century allegorical paintings
Allegorical paintings by German artists